North Dakota Highway 32 (ND 32) is a north–south highway located that traverses portions of nine counties in eastern North Dakota. The  highway is one of several north–south routes in the state that connects the Canadian border to the state's southern border with South Dakota.

Route description
ND 32 begins at the South Dakota state line near Havana, where going south, it continues as South Dakota Highway 27. After the first , it arrives in Forman, the county seat of Sargent. Continuing north, it enters Ransom County. A brief concurrency with ND 46 at the Ransom-Barnes-Cass County tri-point, turning west following the Ransom/Barnes County line, ND 32 finally enters Barnes County. It mainly traverses rural areas of eastern Barnes County, including an intersection with I-94/US 52 at its exit 302 interchange.

In the Sharon area, it straddles the Steele/Griggs County line in its run between the ND 45 junction and the Nelson County line near Aneta.

In Nelson County, ND 32 continues north to Petersburg, where it begins a short concurrency with US 2 which lasts until reaching Niagara, just inside Grand Forks County. It traverses mainly rural areas of northwestern Grand Forks, central Walsh, and western Pembina Counties. In Pembina County, it has brief concurrencies with North Dakota Highways 66 and 5. Walhalla is the last town or community that ND 32 goes through before reaching the Canadian border. ND 32 ends at the Canadian border. At the Walhalla-Winkler Border Crossing, upon entry into southern Manitoba, the road becomes Manitoba Highway 32 (PTH 32), continuing in a northerly direction to Winkler.

Points of interest along the route
Gingras Trading Post State Historic Site, Walhalla

Major intersections

See also
List of Canada-United States border crossings

References

External links

North Dakota Highways Page by Chris Geelhart
NDDOT’s Highway Systems Page

032
042
042
042
042
042
042
042
042
042